San Leo is a comune (municipality) in the Province of Rimini in the Italian region Emilia-Romagna, located about  southeast of Bologna and about  southwest of Rimini.

Geography
San Leo borders the following Italian municipalities: Maiolo, Montecopiolo, Monte Grimano, Novafeltria, Sassofeltrio, Torriana, Verucchio, as also, in the independent State of San Marino, Acquaviva, Chiesanuova, and the  City of San Marino.

The San Leo Co-Cathedral is a Romanesque church.

History 
After the referendum of 17 and 18 December 2006, San Leo was detached from the Province of Pesaro and Urbino (Marche) to join Emilia-Romagna and the Province of Rimini on 15 August 2009.

Twin towns
  San Marino, San Marino

References

External links

 Official website
 Photos
 The town (Il borgo)
 The fortress
 Photo gallery

Cities and towns in Emilia-Romagna